Emma Aastrand Jørgensen (born 30 January 1996) is a Danish sprint canoeist. She and her team-mate Henriette Engel Hansen won the women's K-2 1000 m title at the 2014 World Championships.

Career
She competed at the 2016 Summer Olympics, winning the silver medal in K-1 500 metres. She was defeated by the defending champion Danuta Kozák. She won a bronze medal at the 2016 European Championships in the same category.
Jørgensen competed at the 2020 Summer Olympics, winning a bronze medal in the K-1 200 metres event, finishing behind Lisa Carrington and Teresa Portela and also in the K-1 500 metres event, finishing behind Lisa Carrington and Tamara Csipes.

References

External links

1996 births
Danish female canoeists
Living people
Olympic canoeists of Denmark
Canoeists at the 2016 Summer Olympics
Canoeists at the 2020 Summer Olympics
Olympic silver medalists for Denmark
Olympic bronze medalists for Denmark
Olympic medalists in canoeing
Medalists at the 2016 Summer Olympics
Medalists at the 2020 Summer Olympics
ICF Canoe Sprint World Championships medalists in kayak
Canoeists at the 2019 European Games
European Games medalists in canoeing
European Games gold medalists for Denmark
European Games bronze medalists for Denmark
20th-century Danish women
21st-century Danish women